Vereinigung für Ökologische Ökonomie (VÖÖ) is a German scientific society promoting ecological principles in the global economy.

History and background 

In 1992, the economist  and the physicist Hans-Peter Dürr gave a joint talk at a conference of Verein für Socialpolitik (VfS) on the topic of “economics and nature”. During the discussion, it turned out that the point of view presented had no backing among the attendees of VfS, and Busch-Lüty and colleagues decided to establish an independent society. Busch-Lüty initiated in 1996 the establishment of VÖÖ as part of a small, interdisciplinary group of scientists as a German-speaking section of International Society for Ecological Economics (ISEE). The local mayor and former Member of the European Parliament  acted as a patron of the constitutive conference in April 1996 in Heidelberg. The 50 scientists present shared the belief that the calls of Rio Earth Summit 1992 for establishing a sustainable development are legitimate and need to be realized. Based on the insight that economic growth would be the wrong answer to persistent ecological problems, the scientists wanted to act strategically to alter the academic landscape.

Positions 
The society argues that the economic sciences are overcharged with the necessary transformation and claims, that other scientific fields, politics open to change and the cultural forces of the society as a whole are necessary to implement and shape the change assumed necessary. Since the beginning, VÖÖ emphasized the necessity of a transdisciplinary approach. Until 2010, VÖÖ was involved with establishing the concept of sustainability in its ecological, social and economic perspective. Following a reorientation in 2010, the society promotes a post-growth economy based on the concepts of Niko Paech and others. The concept of sustainable growth is considered to be an oxymoron, and the importance of eco-efficiency, consistency and eco-sufficiency is emphasized.

Activities 

VÖÖ is working in research groups and organizes annual conferences, workshops und releases publications such as a series of discussion papers and books. From October 2010 on, VÖÖ supports students and practitioners via the Netzwerk Wachstumswende.

Hans-Peter Dürr, and Gerhard Scherhorn were founder members.  who deceased November 2010 was honorary chairwoman of the society.

Research prizes 
Between 1998 and 2002, VÖÖ granted together with Schweisfurth-Stiftung the biennal Schweisfurth-Forschungspreis für Ökologische Ökonomie, a research prize for contributions in the field of ecological economics. Since 2004, VÖÖ grants together with several charitable foundations the biennal Kapp-Forschungspreis für Ökologische Ökonomie im remembrance of Karl William Kapp. Since 2013, VÖÖ grants in remembrance of its honorary chairwoman the Christiane Busch-Lüty Förderpreis für Ökologische Ökonomie. Laureates were the sociologist Daniela Gottschlich (2013) and Tilman Santarius (2015).

Literature 
 . Online access.

References

External links 
 German Webseite of VÖÖ
 

Ecological economics
Scientific organisations based in Germany
Heidelberg
Clubs and societies in Germany
Organizations established in 1996
Economics societies